In mathematics, the Dirichlet space on the domain   (named after Peter Gustav Lejeune Dirichlet), is the reproducing kernel Hilbert space of holomorphic functions, contained within the Hardy space ,  for which the Dirichlet integral, defined by

is finite (here dA denotes the area Lebesgue measure on the complex plane ). The latter is the integral occurring in Dirichlet's principle for harmonic functions. It is not a norm in general, since  whenever f is a constant function.

For , we define

This is a semi-inner product, and clearly . We may equip  with an inner product given by

where  is the usual inner product on  The corresponding norm  is given by

Note that this definition is not unique, another common choice is to take , for some fixed .

The Dirichlet space is not an algebra, but the space  is a Banach algebra, with respect to the norm

We usually have  (the unit disk of the complex plane ), in that case , and if 

then 

and

See also
Banach space
Bergman space
Hardy space
Hilbert space

References

Complex analysis
Functional analysis